Priyanka Gandhi Vadra (née Gandhi; born 12 January 1972) is an Indian politician and the general secretary of the All India Congress Committee in charge of Uttar Pradesh. She is the daughter of former Prime Minister of India Rajiv Gandhi and Sonia Gandhi, sister of Rahul Gandhi, and granddaughter of Feroze and Indira Gandhi, making her a member of the politically prominent Nehru-Gandhi family. She is also a trustee of the Rajiv Gandhi Foundation.

Early life and background
Priyanka Gandhi Vadra was born at the Holy Family Hospital in Delhi on 12 January 1972 to former Prime minister of India Rajiv Gandhi and Sonia Gandhi - who later became the President of the Indian National Congress as the younger of their two children. Her older brother Rahul Gandhi is a member of Parliament from Wayanad in Kerala. She is the granddaughter of Indira Gandhi - former and first woman Prime Minister of India and Feroze Gandhi - a freedom fighter and politician, and the great-granddaughter of India’s first Prime Minister Jawaharlal Nehru, and Kamala Nehru.

Priyanka Gandhi did her schooling at Welham Girls' School in Dehradun till 1984. After this, both Rahul and Priyanka were moved to day schools in Delhi due to security reasons.  After the assassination of Indira Gandhi, because of constant terror threats, she and her brother Rahul both were home-schooled. Later she joined the Convent of Jesus and Mary, Delhi. obtaining a bachelor's degree in Psychology from Jesus and Mary College, University of Delhi, and later a master's degree in  Buddhist studies in 2010.

Personal life

In 1997, Gandhi married Robert Vadra - a Delhi-based businessman and the couple has two children- one son and one daughter together. The wedding took place at the Gandhi home, 10 Janpath, on 18 February 1997 in a traditional Hindu ceremony. She is a follower of Buddhist philosophy and practices Vipassana. A Vipassana practitioner for many years, she has done many courses, including the advanced, very rigorous, and intensive ‘Sattipatahana’ courses, as taught by S.N. Goenka and his Vipassana Sadhna Sansthan. She also participated in a retreat to learn about Zen Master Thich Nhat Hanh's meditation techniques. Priyanka Gandhi Vadra is also an amateur radio operator, carrying the call sign of VU2PGY.

Political career

Gandhi had regularly visited her mother's and brother's constituencies of Rae Bareilly and Amethi where she dealt with the people directly. In the 2004 Indian general election, she was her mother's campaign manager and helped supervise her brother Rahul Gandhi's campaign. In the 2007 Uttar Pradesh assembly elections, while Rahul Gandhi managed the statewide campaign, she focused on the ten seats in the Amethi Rae Bareilly region, spending two weeks there trying to quell considerable infighting within the party workers over seat allocations.

Active politics and AICC General Secretary
On January 23, 2019, Priyanka Gandhi officially entered politics, being appointed the Congress' General Secretary in charge of the eastern part of Uttar Pradesh. She was appointed General Secretary in charge of the entire Uttar Pradesh on 11 September 2020. In October 2021, Gandhi was detained by police, who cited a ban on gatherings, while on her way to Agra to meet the family members of a man who allegedly died in police custody.

2022 Uttar Pradesh Legislative Assembly election
Priyanka Gandhi launched Congress party's Uttar Pradesh poll campaign from Barabanki on 23 October 2021. Congress party fought the 2022 Uttar Pradesh assembly election under the leadership of Gandhi, losing comprehensively.

Early years
Even though Gandhi Vadra resisted her direct involvement in politics in the years prior to her official entry in to politics in 2019, she played active roles in election campaign for her mother and brother in general and assembly election. She visited her mother's and brother's constituencies of Rae Bareilly and Amethi regularly where she dealt with the people directly, a role that made her a popular figure in the constituency with mass support, also given rise to the popular election slogan in  Amethi “Amethi ka Danka, Bitiya Priyanka” (the clarion call from Amethi is for Priyanka [to stand elections]. following these roles of her, she successfully established her reputation as a good organizer, and level-headed.

Priyanka Gandhi is believed to be her mother's "chief advisor on political matters" where she has also admitted to writing speeches for her first campaign. in the Indian general election, in 2004, she was her mother's campaign manager and helped supervise her brother Rahul Gandhi's campaign.

In the Uttar Pradesh assembly elections, 2007, while Rahul Gandhi managed the statewide campaign, she focused on the ten seats in the Amethi Rae Bareilly region, spending two weeks there trying to quell considerable infighting within the party workers over seat allocations.

Formal entry into politics
On January 23, 2019, Priyank Gandhi formally entered politics after being appointed as the AICC General Secretary in charge of the eastern part of Uttar Pradesh and then as the General Secretary in charge of the entire Uttar Pradesh on 11 September 2020 preceding 2022 Uttar Pradesh assembly elections. During the period, she dived into several issues as an opposition leader and led many protests again the BJP which rules the state as well as the union government, walking shoulder to shoulder with those protesting against the contentious Citizenship Amendment Act, farmers protesting against three farms law on the borders of Delhi, the family of Hathras rape victim and the families of farmers killed by a speeding SUV allegedly driven by a Union minister’s son in UP.

In October 2021, Gandhi was detained twice by the UP police. The first detention followed her visit to Lakhimpur Kheri in western UP where eight people were killed following clashes between protesting farmers  and the convey of Union Minister Ajay Misra's son She and several other party leaders were detained at a PAC guest house in Sitapur, which was being used as a “temporary jail” to keep them for over 50 hrs. The second detention tool place in the district of Agra where the UP Police detained her citing a ban on gatherings, while on her way to Agra to meet the family members of a man who allegedly died in police custody

2022 Uttar Pradesh assembly elections
In January 2022, Priyanka Gandhi Vadra launched the Congress's manifesto for the 2022 Uttar Pradesh Legislative Assembly election along with her brother Rahul Gandhi. The manifesto that was majorly focused on youth and women empowerment along with development for the state also promised 40% of tickets to women in upcoming Uttar Pradesh assembly polls.

Pivoting majority on women empowerment and participation in politics, she kickstarted the "Ladki hoon, Lad Sakti hoon campaign in the state. On the day of International Women's day, she launched a rally in the state’s capital Lucknow which laced with several promises and hopes, saw a massive turnout and participation of women from all over the state.

Despite all her attempts to revive the party in Uttar Pradesh and bring reforms to the polity of the state, the Congress Party faced a defeat in the assembly elections; winning 2 out of the 403 assembly seats.

Post-2022 Uttar Pradesh assembly elections

The joint defeat in four other states along with UP led the Congress party to brainstorm and bring in organisational and functional changes that reflected in her political journey.

Accepting the defeat in UP, during her first visit to the state after the elections, she talked of revamping the party and urged the party workers not to give up;  signalling her determination to continue with her plans for the state.

On 5 August 2022, she took part in Congress’s ‘Mehangai Par Halla Bol’ protest against price-rise and inflation and was detained by the Delhi police. Gandhi was well-appreciated and was compared with her grandmother and former PO of India Indira Gandhi for her strong will and perseverance to fight for the people and their issues.

She is also said to have played an active role in the Congress presidential election.

2022 Himachal Pradesh elections
In December 2022, Priyanka Gandhi Vadra led the Congress Party to victory over the rival Bhartiya Janta Party in the 2022 Himachal Pradesh Legislative Assembly election. She spearheaded the campaign with Chief Minister of Chhattisgarh Bhupesh Baghel, Congress leader Sachin Pilot and leaders and workers from Himachal Pradesh Congress Committee.

On 14th October 2022, Priyanka Gandhi Vadra held the first of five rallies in Solan towards a better tomorrow for the state of Himachal Pradesh - “Parivartan Pratigya Rally” that ensured Congress Party’s victory in the state.

Priyanka Gandhi Vadra began her journey with divine blessings from Maa Shoolini Temple in Solan district where she paid her obeisance.

Starting 31st of October with a visit to the famous Bhootnath temple of Mandi, Priyanka Gandhi Vadra promised to curb unemployment and inflation as part of 10 pre-poll promises free electricity (up to 300 units), restoration of the old pension system, and ₹680 crores as a start-up fund as part of its promises.

Her third rally took place in the Kangra district, where Priyanka Gandhi along with Chhattisgarh Chief Minister Bhupesh Baghel, on the 4th of November, paid obeisance at the Jwala Devi Temple before addressing a rally at Gandhi Ground of Nagrota Bagwan.

Priyanka Gandhi's public address in Kangra was much based on the issue faced by the youth, farmers, and women, inflation, unemployment, and OPS.

On the 7th of November in Una district, addressing a political rally at Kangar in Haroli, she urged people to continue the tradition of changing governments after every five years and attack BJP's "double-engine government" questioning what they had done for the state in the last five years.

In her fifth and last rally in Sirmaur on the 10th of November, Priyanka Gandhi Vadra concluded her campaign by promising 10 guarantees that built the backbone of the whole campaign. A month following the campaigning and polls in the state, the Congress Party finally made government with Sukhvinder Singh Sukhu pledging as the Chief Minister of Himachal Pradesh on 11th of December 2022.

See also

 List of political families
 Nehru-Gandhi family

Notes

References

1972 births
Indian National Congress politicians from Delhi
Indian people of Italian descent
Living people
Nehru–Gandhi family
Women in Delhi politics
Delhi University alumni
Children of prime ministers of India
Women in Uttar Pradesh politics
21st-century Buddhists
Indian Buddhists
21st-century Indian women politicians
21st-century Indian politicians
20th-century Indian women politicians
20th-century Indian politicians
People from New Delhi
Indian people of Kashmiri descent
Welham Girls' School alumni